Abel Castellano Jr.  (born June 6, 1983, in Maracaibo, Venezuela) is a jockey in Thoroughbred horse racing who rode his first winner on September 22, 1999, at Santa Rita Race Course in his native Venezuela. The following year he began riding in the United States at Gulfstream Park in 2000. Racing runs in Castellano's family. His father, who died in 2000, his uncle and a brother all have been jockeys. He considers his father to be biggest influence on his career as his brother Javier Castellano recipient of four Eclipse Award for Outstanding Jockey in the row (2013, 2014, 2015 and 2016).

References

1983 births
Living people
Sportspeople from Maracaibo
Venezuelan expatriate sportspeople in the United States
Venezuelan jockeys
American jockeys